The siege of Thionville was a battle during the War of the First Coalition.

Siege
It began at Thionville on 24 August 1792. A coalition force of 20,000 Austrians and 16,000 French Royalist troops under Frederick Louis, Prince of Hohenlohe-Ingelfingen failed to take the town, commanded by Georges Félix de Wimpffen, and raised the siege on 16 October. One of the French royalist troops was François-René de Chateaubriand, who was wounded in the battle.

Aftermath
In the aftermath of the siege the National Convention declared that Thionville had "deserved well of the fatherland" - it named Place de Thionville and Rue de Thionville in Paris after the victory.

Legacy
Louis-Emmanuel Nadine created the lyrical drama Siége de Thionville in 1793.

Notes

References

External links

Battles involving Austria
Conflicts in 1792
1792 in France
Sieges of the War of the First Coalition
Battles of the War of the First Coalition
Battles in Grand Est